Mario René Berríos Castillo (born May 29, 1982 in Tela) is a Honduran former football midfielder that only played for Marathón in Liga Nacional de Honduras.

Club career
A one-club man, the left-sided Berríos has played his entire professional career for Marathón. He made his first apparition for Marathón at the 2000–01 Clausura, when José de la Paz Herrera was the coach of the team.

He is also captain of the team. On August 8, 2015, during the 2015–16 Apertura, Berríos received a special recognition from Marathón, for he got to play 400 games with the team. Berríos scored 40 goals for Marathón during his 17 years in the team. On November 18, 2017, after 17 years spending with Marathón, and 470 appearances, he announced his retirement.

International career
Berrios made his debut for Honduras in a November 2002 friendly match against Colombia and has earned a total of 13 caps, scoring no goals. He has represented his country at the 2005 UNCAF Nations Cup as well as at the 2005 CONCACAF Gold Cup. and the 2013 CONCACAF Gold Cup.

Honours and awards

Club
C.D. Marathón
Liga Profesional de Honduras: 2001–02 C, 2002–03 C, 2004–05 A, 2007–08 A, 2008–09 A, 2009–10 A
Honduran Cup: 2017

References

External links

 Honduras Football Lineup
 Mario Berríos “Tegus me viene bien”, advierte el capitán del Marathón - El Heraldo 

1982 births
Living people
People from Tela
Association football defenders
Honduran footballers
Honduras international footballers
2005 UNCAF Nations Cup players
2005 CONCACAF Gold Cup players
2013 CONCACAF Gold Cup players
C.D. Marathón players
Liga Nacional de Fútbol Profesional de Honduras players